Mario Landriscina (born 10 April 1954) is an Italian politician.

Landriscina ran as an independent for the office of Mayor of Como at the 2017 Italian local elections, supported by a centre-right coalition. He won and took office on 27 June 2017.

See also
2017 Italian local elections
List of mayors of Como

References

External links
 

1954 births
Living people
Mayors of Como